Kid Galahad may refer to:

Kid Galahad, a 1962 film starring Elvis Presley
 Kid Galahad (EP), an EP by Elvis Presley, containing songs from the above-mentioned film
Kid Galahad (1937 film), featuring Edward G. Robinson, Bette Davis, and Humphrey Bogart
Kid Galahad, former name of British band The Furze
Kid Galahad, nickname of Abdul Barry Awad (born 1990), British boxer